S. Kidman & Co is one of Australia's largest beef producers with a herd of 171,000 cattle. It has 13 pastoral leases covering 80,000 square kilometres in the states of Queensland, South Australia and Western Australia and the Northern Territory.

History
S. Kidman & Co was founded in 1899 by Sidney Kidman. He was one of the greatest pastoral landholders in Australian history and became known by the nickname of "The Cattle King".

S. Kidman & Co is still the largest private landholder in Australia, although now on a much smaller scale. The total value of the company was estimated at 360 million with two Chinese companies, Genius Link Asset Management and Shanghai Pengxin, interested in acquiring the company. The sale was blocked by the Treasurer of Australia Scott Morrison who cited the national interest clause in the Foreign Investment Act. In 2015, Kidman recorded $62 million in livestock sales reflecting an increase of 10.71% on the previous year.

In December 2016, a Hancock Prospecting (67%) / Shanghai CRED (33%) joint venture purchased the company.

Locations

References

External links

Real estate companies of Australia
Food and drink companies established in 1899
Companies based in Adelaide
Australian companies established in 1899
Food and drink companies of Australia